The Rebricea is a left tributary of the river Bârlad in Romania. It discharges into the Bârlad near Vulturești.

References

Rivers of Romania
Rivers of Iași County
Rivers of Vaslui County